Mischief or malicious mischief is the name for a criminal offenses that is defined differently in different legal jurisdictions. While the wrongful acts will often involve what is popularly described as vandalism, there can be a legal differentiation between vandalism and mischief. The etymology of the word comes from Old French meschief, which means "misfortune", from meschever, "to end badly".

Scotland
Malicious mischief is an offence against the common law of Scotland. It does not require actual damage to property for the offence to be committed; financial damage consequential to the act is sufficient, unlike vandalism which requires actual damage to property to form the offence, the latter being defined by section 52 of the Criminal Law (Consolidation) (Scotland) Act 1995.

United States
In United States criminal law, mischief is an offense against property that typically involves the intentional or reckless infliction of property damage, defacement, alteration, or destruction of property. Common forms include vandalism, and graffiti. Governed by state law, criminal mischief is committed when a perpetrator, having no right to do so nor any reasonable ground to believe that he/she has such right, intentionally or recklessly damages property of another person, intentionally participates in the destruction of property of another person, or participates in the reckless damage or destruction of property of another person.

Canada
The country's Criminal Code makes mischief a hybrid offence, punishable by up to and including life imprisonment if the mischief causes actual danger to human life. Public mischief is the term for the crime of wasting police time.

References

External links 
 

Legal terminology
Vandalism